The Maldives National Defence Force (MNDF) is the combined security organisation responsible for defending the security and sovereignty of the Maldives. It is primarily responsible for attending to all internal and external security needs of the Maldives, including the protection of the exclusive economic zone (EEZ) and the maintenance of peace and security.

History

Origin of the Security Force
Hagubeykalun, the first known reference to the Maldivian defenders, dates back prior to the reign of Sultan Al-Gazi Mohamed Thakurufaan ( ruled 1573-1585 AD/CE ). Here the three bearers of high office designated as Maafaiy, Faamuladheyri, and Dhaharaadha were responsible for organising the security of the country.

Sultan Al-Gazi Mohamed Thakurufaan reorganised the existing security force at that time and appointed a "Dhoshimeynaa Wazir" (a Minister) as the head of the security force.

The origin of the current security force can be traced from the initiatives of Sultan Ibrahim Nooraddeen Iskandhar who reigned from 1888 to 1892. The Sultan was impressed by a group of young men practicing marching in step while they were at the Sultans Palace to learn a traditional form of Maldivian martial arts. The Sultan gave his blessings to their new drill and facilitated their training. The group of men thereafter began to accompany the Sultan on his ceremonial processions.

During Sultan Ibrahim Nooraddeen Iskandhar's brief reign, he enlisted selected youths and taught them Hevikan (a Maldivian form of martial arts) and made them participate in royal ceremonies. On 21 April 1892, a new security force was established by a royal decree. The Sultan became the Commander-in-Chief of the security force. This new force was authorised to carry arms and the Palace afforded special privileges to them.

Evolution of the Security Force

Since the establishment of a security force, it has served as a combined force except for two brief periods. A police force was formed on 29 March 1933, during the reign of Sultan Mohamed Shamsuddeen III, but it was soon disbanded. The police force was re-established on 13 March 1972, as a branch of the security force, which was then known as National Guards, functioning under the Ministry of Public Safety.

On 10 January 1979, after years of evolution and progress, the Ministry of Public Safety and the National Guards were renamed as the Ministry of Defence and National Security and the National Security Service (NSS) respectively. The police remained as an integral part of it until it was declared a civil body under Ministry of Home Affairs and renamed as the Maldives Police Service on 1 September 2004.

The National Security Service (NSS) remained a multi-functional force, directly under the command, direction and supervision of the Minister of Defence and National Security. The President was the Commander-in-Chief of the NSS, and the Minister of Defence and National Security was the Deputy Commander-in-Chief.

Maldives National Defence Force
With the separation of police as a civil body, the mission and duties of the NSS had to be revised. This revision envisaged a totally different turn for the organization. Hence, to carry out the newly derived mission and tasks, the core of its structure had to be modified and redesigned. All these new implementations created more of an infantry organization and was renamed the Maldives National Defence Force (MNDF), on its 114th anniversary, on 21 April 2006 by the president Maumoon Abdul Gayyoom.

Organizational structure

Coast Guard

The Maldives being a water bound nation, most of its security concerns lie at sea. Almost 90% of the country is covered by sea and the remaining 10% comprising land is scattered over an area of 415 km x 120 km, with the largest island (altogether 1192 islands) being not more than 8 km2. The geographic location and formation of the country provides ideal conditions for the smugglers to carry out their activities taking Maldives as a covert route to their destinations.

Therefore, the duties assigned to the MNDF of maintaining surveillance over Maldivian waters and providing protection against foreign intruders poaching in the EEZ and territorial waters, are immense tasks from both logistical and economic view points. Hence, for carrying out these functions, it is the Coast Guard that plays a vital role. To provide timely security its patrol boats are stationed at various MNDF Regional Headquarters.

The Coast Guard is also assigned to respond to the maritime distress calls and to conduct search and rescue operations in a timely manner. Maritime pollution control exercises are conducted regularly on an annual basis for familiarization and handling of such hazardous situations. The Coast Guard also undertakes armed sea transport of troops and military equipment around the country.

Tasks:
 Protecting territorial waters, EEZ, and the marine environment.
 Conducting search and rescue, and salvage operations.
 Enforcing maritime law.
 VIP and convoy protection.
 Coastal surveillance.

Marine Corps

The Marine Corps (formerly known as Quick Reaction Force) are established at various strategic locations and vulnerable areas to enhance the force projection to provide their services throughout the country. The Marine Corps is composed of Marine Deployment Units (MDUs).

They are deployed for the purpose of maintaining security in their key areas of responsibility and their operational conduct involves;

 Assistance to Coast Guard in maritime operations.
 Assistance to Civil Authorities at times of crisis.
 Search and Rescue operations.
 Providing KP guards.
 Undertaking combat operations.
 Conducting counter insurgency.
 Carrying out counter terrorism operations.

The Marine Corps is often assigned on non-combat missions such as providing humanitarian assistance and disaster relief operations.

Special Forces

The Special Forces (SF) are the elite combat units of the MNDF. They are trained to perform their duties in all conditions at any time, in any part of the world. Specifically their involvement comes in situations where it is impediment to regular infantry forces.

SF was formally raised on 9 February 2009. Since then, SF has been organized in such a manner that they can conduct missions demanding rapid response and surgical applications. Their primary tasks involve Counter Terrorism (CT), and national intervention operations, and as essentially the SF is an intense versatile group, their missions include, but are not limited to, hostage rescue, sabotage, raids and critical intelligence gathering. They are not only confined to the role of achieving disruption by ‘hit and run’ and sabotage in the traditional conventional combat scenario, but additionally, are trained to combat terrorists, their possible infrastructure, and activities.

For that reason, the Special Forces of the MNDF are popular for their specialization in a wide variety of unique special operations skills, attained through a high level of training. The SF undergoes an intense year-long calendar cycle of scrupulous special forces training which demands stringent physical agility, psychological wellbeing and intelligence. In addition, they take part in training with other world renowned special forces units and also train them as well.

The Soldiers are generally qualified in parachute jumping and specializes on marksmanship, slithering, diving and other special ops tactical skills.  On the whole, a profound emphasis is placed on physical fitness and skill training so that the each member will be able to withstand the rigors of real time tactical operations.

This specialised group of men forms the lethal special forces unit of the MNDF as they are highly trained and ready for any challenge facing the nation. They are armed with the most advanced and state of the art  weapons and gear, and will not hesitate to use them when the situation demands it. Hence, it is the strategic asset of the MNDF which will be utilized in exceptional situations and unquestionably with the order and direction of the highest civil authority.

Service Corps
The supporting units take the role of support arms in the modern armies. They are mainly responsible to facilitate the necessary equipment and services to the whole organization.

The support services are the backbone of the MNDF. From the very early days, some form of a support element existed within the framework of the MNDF. Over the years, the support services have developed to cater for the changing needs and demands of the MNDF. As part of the development of the MNDF, professionals are being trained in highly specialised fields for smoother and efficient operations in completing the missions and tasks entrusted.

Communication, Electronics and Information Technology Service
Communication, Electronics and Information Technology Service (CEITS) caters all communication related needs of MNDF. This also includes the servicing and repairing of communication equipment. Along with the communication assistance it is also tasked to implement and monitor the information technology needs of the organization.

Transport Service
Transport Service (TS) provides land and sea transport which are vital to the prompt and efficient mobility of the MNDF. Being a sea bound and a scattered island nation, much of the communication network depends upon proper transportation.

TS cater the transport needs of the organization as a whole. Some units of MNDF do have their own independent modes of transportation, but to those unit which do not own independent transportation means and for massive load carrying TS involvement is vital.

Quarter Master Service
Quarter Master Service (QMS). Issue of Q items and provision of all food and ration requirement of MNDF are the main concerns of this unit. Most of these services are provided to MNDF by contracting out to private sector. Therefore, to make the necessary contracts with concerned parties and monitoring and supervision of the service provided is a responsibility of QMS.

Sub-units:
 Catering Service
 Uniform Section

Band and Music Wing
Band and Music Wing (BMW). From the very birth of the security force, a form of ceremonial detachment was established to accompany the Sultan in his ceremonial processions. This ceremonial band has changed from a band of drums and trumpets to a modern brass band. BMW takes part in the ceremonial parades and at all the MNDF and national level ceremonies.

Other Supporting Units
Ordnance Service (OS)
 Media and Publishing Service (MPS)
 Supply Unit (SU)
Explosive Ordnance Disposal (EOD)

Corps of Engineers

Military Engineering Service
Military Engineering Service (MES)s main function is to design and build all new buildings of the MNDF and to maintain the existing infrastructure of the MNDF. Today the able men and women of MES have the potential to do everything related to construction of buildings from its designing phase to the completion of construction.

Electrical and Mechanical Engineers
Electrical and Mechanical Engineers (EME) deals with every matter related to the repair, maintenance, modification, production of spare parts, and electrical and mechanical equipment of MNDF. Apart from this they are also entitled for marine engineering, fibre glassing, air-conditioning, production of various metal structures and to bring required modifications to the weapons used in MNDF. They have the authority to check on any such item at any time which is entrusted to any unit of the MNDF.

Special Protection Group
Special Protection Group (SPG) too undertakes all these responsibilities, but their primary mission remains to protect and safeguard the Head of State as well as visiting dignitaries.

This unit was formally established soon after the 3 November 1988 incident. At first they were known as the Special Guards with a group of well-trained MNDF soldiers. As the forces tasks and mission expanded, the group was renamed Special Protection Group (SPG).

Military Police
Article 43 of Act no: 1/2008 Armed Forces Act states that the Minister must establish military police from within the Armed Forces who shall be responsible for investigations into offences committed by members of the Armed Forces, the investigation of different problems arising within the Armed Forces and the taking of the necessary actions in such matters, the maintenance of security of the centers of the Armed Forces and of the activities carried out by the Armed Forces, the locating of service-men who desert their duties, and the administration of all matters related to captives captured during times of war.

The existence of Military Police (MP) within the Armed Forces is highly crucial to the implementation of military discipline within the Armed Forces and to the discipline and conduct of members of the Armed Forces. It is for this reason that the Minister of Defense established the Military Police within the Maldives National Defense Force (MNDF) as required by the Armed Forces Act.

The Military Police will implement the military laws and regulations during normal situations and during operational situations, and will also carry out ceremonial duties assigned to them.

The establishment of a Military Police within the MNDF will further improve law enforcement, and will enable the members of the Armed Forces to enhance their respect for human rights and their trustworthiness in their national service.

Branches: Maldives Military Police consists of 6 main branches. They are;
 Headquarters
 Law Enforcement
 Investigation
 Detention
 Security Support
 Ceremonial Duties

Coast Guard Aviation Squadron

MNDF Coast Guard Aviation Squadron is the air component of the Defence Force which is mandated to protect and safeguard the Maldivian Airspace, to monitor the illegal and suspicious activities within Maldivian waters and to conduct search, rescue and surveillance operations. In addition, the Aviation Squadron carries out transferring patients to the health centres in emergency cases and transporting the Maldives' Special Forces across the country to counter various threats.

Current inventory

College of Defence and Security Studies 
College of Defence and Securitity Studies (CDSS) is the officiating unit. Training centres are established to train MNDF personnel from basics leading up to specialized training.

Furthermore, selected personnel are trained in overseas training establishments and institutions in academic, technical and other professional areas to enhance the professionalism of the MNDF. Joint training exercises are also conducted routinely with other countries.

Tasks:
 Providing institutional training.
 Carrying out collective and individual training.
 Conducting training exercises.
 Co-ordinating training activities of all units

Training Centers:
 NCO Academy
 Officer Training Wing
 Marine Corps Training School
 Coast Guard Training School
 Fire and Rescue Training School

Fire and Rescue Service
Fire and Rescue Service (FRS) shoulders the responsibilities of providing fire-fighting and rescue services to the public. Presently, a timely service is given to the inhabitants of capital island Mal'e and nearby islands.

However, efforts are being made to transfer this service to the public. Already all over the country people are trained in fire fighting skills and community based civil fire fighting sub stations are established in various regions.

Tasks:
 Conducting fire emergency operations.
 Carrying out rescue operations.
 Providing protection to property.

Medical Corps
Medical Corps (MEDIC) is the authority responsible to provide medical assistance to men and women of the MNDF.

Welfare of the MNDF personnel has always been of paramount importance from the early days of the establishment of the security force and an established Medical Clinic came into existence in 1992. The trained men and women of Medic are round the clock at the medical assistance of the service men and women of MNDF. No matter on land or sea, they are where the troops are and provide timely service.

Special medical provision is made to those patients with illnesses that cannot be cured or treated in the Maldives by sending them abroad for further treatment. Furthermore, opportunities for training in the medical fields are being afforded to competent applicants as and when possible.

Area Commands
Male' Area
 Northern Area
 Central Area
 Southern Area

Non-Military Services
 Sifainge Cooperative (SIFCO)
 Sifainge Family Association (SIFAMA)
 Sifainge Welfare Company
 Maldives Military Veterans (MalVets)
 Dhivehi Sifainge Club (DSC)

Maldives Military Vehicles
3x Otokar Cobra 
2x BMP-2 
14x Toyota Land Cruiser 
14x Arunima Bolyan 
2x Ashok Leyland Ambulance 4x4  
2x HAL Dhruv 
1x Dornier 228 
1x MCGS Huravee

Recruitment
The number of recruits for each year is predetermined by the President's Office and the Ministry of Defence with the assistance of the MNDF HQ.

When the advertisements seeking for potential recruits appears in the media, interested candidates can submit their “expression of interest” to the Ministry of Defence.

The Ministry of Defence shall notify the time and place of interview for those who had expressed their interest. Those who do not qualify the current basic entry criteria, however, shall not be called for an interview.

Basic Entry Criteria for Maldives National Defence Force:
 Candidate must have completed GCE Ordinary Level or Grade 10 ( or an equivalent vocational training )
 Candidate must have a minimum height of 5’ 5"/165.10 centimetres (males) or 5’ 3"/160.02 centimetres (females)
 Candidate must be between 18 and 25 years of age
 Candidate should not have any police records for past five years
 Candidate must not be registered in a Political Party

Rank structure

The ranking system of the MNDF is based on the traditional British military system and U.S. military system. The highest flag rank ever awarded was that of lieutenant general, in a non-military capacity to the previous Defence Minister Abdul Sattar, although the president being the commander in chief also holds the rank of general in a non-military capacity.

Officer corps

Warrant officer corps

Enlisted corps

Medals and ribbons

Medals
 Medal of Honor
 Presidential Medal
 MNDF Medal
 Distinguished Service Medal
 Good Conduct Medal
 Medal for Exceptional Bravery
 Dedicated Service Medal
 Medal of Bravery
 Purple Heart
 Long Service Medal
 Gold Life Saving Medal
 Silver Life Saving Medal
 3 November Medal
 Centenary Medal
 Saarc Summit Medal
 Minivan 50 Medal

Ribbons
 Presidential Ribbon
 MNDF Ribbon
 Long Service Ribbon
 Ribbon of Skill
 Dedicated Service Ribbon
 Special Duty Ribbon
 Achievement Ribbon
 Marksmanship Ribbon
 Ribbon for Bravery
 Good Conduct Ribbon

General officers

Serving general officers
 Major General Abdulla Shamaal - Chief of Defence Force 
 Brigadier General Abdul Raheem Abdul Latheef - Vice Chief of Defence Force
 Brigadier General Wais Waheed - Commandant, MNDF Marine Corps
 Brigadier General Hamid Shafeeq - Commandant, MNDF Service Corps
 Brigadier General Ismail Shareef - Commandant, MNDF Northern area
 Brigadier General Mohamed Shareef - Commandant, MNDF Fire and rescue services
 Brigadier General Abdul Matheen Ahmed
 Brigadier General Abdulla Zuhree

Retired general officers
 Lieutenant General Ambaree Abdul Sattar   (Chief of Defence Force from 21 April 1992 - 1 January 1996)
 Major General Mohamed Zahir (Chief of Defence Force from 1 January 1996 - 18 Nov 2008)
 Major General Moosa Ali Jaleel  (Chief of Defence Force from 18 Nov 2008 - 7 February 2012 )
 Major General Adam Zahir 
 Major General Ahmed Shiyam (Former Chief of Defence Force)
 Brigadier General Ahmed Shahid (Former Vice Chief of Defence Force)
 Brigadier General Farhath Shaheer (Former Vice Chief of Defence Force)
 Brigadier General Ahmed Shahid (Former Vice Chief of Defence Force)
 Brigadier General Ahmed Naeem Mohamed
 Brigadier General Zakariyya Mansoor - Director General of Counter-Terrorism, Ministry of Defence
 Brigadier General Ibrahim Mohamed Didi
 Brigadier General Ahmed Mohamed (former Vice Chief of Defence Force )
 Brigadier General Ali Zuhair (former commander of Coast Guard)

Dismissed general officers
 Colonel Ahmed Nilam

Note:

 Ambaree Abdul Sattar is the only person to have held lieutenant general rank and also served as the Minister of State for Defence.
 Adam Zahir held the rank of major General from 29 April 2004 to 1 September 2004 prior to the appointment as Commissioner at Maldives Police Service.
 Colonel Ahmed Nilam held the rank of brigadier general before he was demoted and dismissed from the service. He was dismissed for failing to act according to the responsibilities, conduct and rules of MNDF.
 Moosa Ali Jaleel is the only person who have served as both the Minister of Defence and Chief of Defence Force.

See also
MNDF Coast Guard
MNDF Marine Corps
MNDF Special Forces

References

External links
 
 www.facebook.com/mndfpage facebook.com
 twitter.com
 youtube.com
 flickr.com

Law enforcement in the Maldives
Military of the Maldives
1978 establishments in the Maldives